Alexander is an unincorporated community in Buncombe County, North Carolina, United States. Alexander has a post office with ZIP code 28701, which opened on September 13, 1881.

References

Unincorporated communities in Buncombe County, North Carolina
Unincorporated communities in North Carolina